George Hope Bertram (March 12, 1847 – 20 March 1900) was a Canadian businessman and politician.

Born in Fenton Barns, Scotland to Hugh Bertram and Isabella Mack, Bertram emigrated to join his brother John in Canada in 1865. After opening a hardware store in Lindsay, Ontario, he moved to Toronto in 1876. A prominent businessman, Bertram was elected to federal parliament as a member of the House of Commons of Canada for Toronto Centre in an 1897 by-election. Bertram's daughter, Christine Mabel married William Henry Moore, a writer and lawyer who also became a Member of the Canadian House of Commons from Ontario. A Liberal, he died in office in 1900 and is buried in Mount Pleasant Cemetery, Toronto.

His brother John also served in the House of Commons.

References
 
 

1847 births
1900 deaths
Canadian Unitarians
Liberal Party of Canada MPs
Members of the House of Commons of Canada from Ontario
Scottish emigrants to pre-Confederation Ontario
Immigrants to the Province of Canada